Mycena domingensis is a mushroom in the family Mycenaceae. Found in Venezuela, it was described in 1961 by English mycologist R.W.G. Dennis. The flesh is white. The gills are widely spaced, white, and decurrently attached to the stem. The spores are oblong, amyloid, and measure 4–6 by 2–2.5 μm.

References

External links

Fungi described in 1961
Fungi of Venezuela
domingensis